Free The Pterodactyl 3 is the third album by Hot Club de Paris. It was released CD through Moshi Moshi Records on January 17, 2011. It is  a collection of tracks from the EP's With Days Like This As Cheap As Chewing Gum, Why Would Anyone Want To Work? and The Rise And Inevitable Fall Of The High School Suicide Cluster Band previously released in 2010.

Track listing

Personnel

 Band
Paul Rafferty- Lead Vocals, Baritone Guitar, Bass
Matthew Smith - Guitar, Backing Vocals
Alasdair Smith- Drums, Percussion. Backing Vocals

 Additional personnel
Genevieve Rosa Zambina, Graham Jones, Andrew Hunt, Kate Smith, Andrew Donovan, Christopher McIntosh, Sam Walkerdine- Additional Vocals

 Production
Hot Club De Paris - production
Robert Whiteley - Engineer, Mix
Paul Rafferty - Sleeve Artwork

2011 albums
Hot Club de Paris albums